Very is the 2nd studio album by the German progressive metal band Dreamscape.

Track listing 

 "When Shadows Are Gone" – 4:45
 "Lost Faith" – 1:05
 "Thorn in My Mind" – 5:27
 "Reborn" – 4:32
 "A Voice Inside" – 5:35
 "Winter Dreams" – 5:59
 "Fearing the Daylight" – 4:56
 "I Leave the Past Behind" – 7:25
 "Alone - Panterei Part I" – 4:29
 "She's Flying - Panterei Part II" – 7:00
 "A New Beginning - Panterei Part III" – 4:14
 "Dancing with Tears in My Eyes" (bonus track) – 4:49

1999 albums
Dreamscape (band) albums